Great Railway Journeys, originally titled Great Railway Journeys of the World, is a recurring series of travel documentaries produced by BBC Television. The premise of each programme is that the presenter, typically a well-known figure from the arts or media, would make a journey by train, usually through a country or to a destination to which they had a personal connection. The first series, which used the longer title, was broadcast on BBC2 in 1980.  After a 14-year hiatus, a further three series were broadcast between 1994 and 1999, using the shorter series title.  Similar series were broadcast in 1983, Great Little Railways, and 2010, Great British Railway Journeys.

The first series is notable in that it featured the first television travelogue by comedian and comic actor Michael Palin ("Confessions of a Trainspotter"), who would go on to become as well known for his travel series (such as Pole to Pole and Sahara) as for his comedy.

English musician and sound artist Chris Watson worked as an audio recorder for the fourth episode "Los Mochis to Veracruz" of the fourth season. Having spent between five weeks to a month on the train, Watson used field recordings of the journey for his 2011 album El Tren Fantasma.

Series

Series 1: Great Railway Journeys of the World (1980)

Episode summary for Series 1:

Series 2: Great Railway Journeys (1994)
Episode summary for Series 2:

Series 3: Great Railway Journeys (1996)
Episode summary for Series 3:

Series 4: Great Railway Journeys (1999)
Episode summary for Series 4:

Great Little Railways
In 1983, the BBC made a further series on rail travel entitled Great Little Railways, this time exclusively featuring narrow gauge railways. This series relied on narrators rather than presenters who appeared on camera. In some cases, the narrator did not partake in the train journey, and simply recited the writing of that episode's producer.

Great British Railway Journeys
In January 2010 BBC Two broadcast Great British Railway Journeys, a documentary with similar basic idea to Great Railway Journeys but with a different format.

Journeys are mainly focused on Great Britain, and is presented by the ex-politician and broadcaster Michael Portillo. The first series detailed four railway journeys following an 1840 Bradshaw's guide, split into a run of 20 separate episodes. The first series proved a success and a second series followed a year later in January 2011. A third series followed in January 2012, including five episodes on railways in Ireland.

A fourth series aired in January 2013, also with 25 episodes, with the last five episodes focused again on railways in Ireland. A fifth series following in January 2014 with 20 episodes, making a total airing of 115 episodes across the five series.

By the middle of 2021, 13 series have been made, totalling 245 episodes.

Great Continental Railway Journeys
From 2012, BBC Two has also broadcast series of Great Continental Railway Journeys, a documentary with the same idea as Great British Railway Journeys, also presented by Portillo. It detailed railway journeys in mainland Europe, following a 1913 Bradshaw's guide to European rail travel.

Other similar series followed: Great Indian Railway Journeys in 2018 and Great Alaskan and Canadian Railroad Journeys and Great Australian Railway Journeys in 2019.

Great Asian Railway Journeys

Starting in 2020, a new series featuring railways and locations in South East Asia is being broadcast on BBC2.

Media
Although there have been no complete series of Great Railway Journeys released on DVD, Michael Palin's 1980 and 1994 programmes are available individually (BBCDVD1626) and as part of a box set of his collected travel documentaries, The Michael Palin Collection (BBCDVD2214).  All seven of the 1980 Series 1 programs, including Palin's Confessions of a Train Spotter, were released in 1986 in cooperation with the BBC on VHS tapes by Pentrex, a California railroad video company.  They are now long out-of-print, but occasionally are offered from online sellers.  The six episodes of 1994's Series 2 were also released on VHS.  Often available in a six-pack of programs, though also out-of-print, they are commonly found for purchase online. In 2020, the BBC made series 2 available on the BBC iPlayer.

Books have been published to accompany the first three series, with a chapter by each of the presenters on their particular journey:

 Frayn, M. et al. (1981), Great Railway Journeys of the World, BBC Books, hardcover, 
 Anderson, C. et al. (1994), Great Railway Journeys, BBC Books, hardcover, 
 Allen, B. et al. (1996), More Great Railway Journeys, BBC Books, hardcover, 

A similar book was also published on Great Little Railways:

 Chamberlin, E.R. et al. (1984) Great Little Railways, BBC Books, hardcover,

References

External links
 
 
 Great Little Railways - "The Good and The Quick" 1983 Complete 40min episode

1980 British television series debuts
1999 British television series endings
1980s British documentary television series
1990s British documentary television series
BBC television documentaries
British travel television series
Documentary television series about railway transport
English-language television shows
Adventure travel